Vladimir Ivković (25 July 1929 – 10 March 1992) was a Croat water polo player who competed for Yugoslavia in the 1952 Summer Olympics and in the 1956 Summer Olympics. He was born in Dubrovnik. Ivković was part of the Yugoslav team which won the silver medal in the 1952 tournament. He played two matches. Four years later he won again the silver medal with the Yugoslav team in the 1956 tournament, and again he played two matches.

See also
 List of Olympic medalists in water polo (men)

References

External links
 

1929 births
1992 deaths
Sportspeople from Dubrovnik
Croatian male water polo players
Yugoslav male water polo players
Olympic water polo players of Yugoslavia
Water polo players at the 1952 Summer Olympics
Water polo players at the 1956 Summer Olympics
Olympic silver medalists for Yugoslavia
Olympic medalists in water polo
Medalists at the 1956 Summer Olympics
Medalists at the 1952 Summer Olympics